The 2005 Southern Conference baseball tournament was held at Joseph P. Riley Jr. Park in Charleston, South Carolina, from May 23 through 27. Eighth seeded  won the tournament and earned the Southern Conference's automatic bid to the 2005 NCAA Division I baseball tournament. It was the Paladins' second SoCon tournament win.

The top eight baseball programs in the conference participated in the double-elimination tournament. Davidson, Wofford, and Appalachian State were not in the field. While College of Charleston dominated the regular season, Furman swept Davidson in the final regular season series to make the tournament, then swept the tournament for the unlikely championship.

Seeding

Bracket 
Seeding and pairings:

All-Tournament Team

References 

Tournament
Southern Conference Baseball Tournament
SoCon baseball tournament
Southern Conference baseball tournament